The Battle of Mesilla may refer to: 
 First Battle of Mesilla
 Second Battle of Mesilla